Blakebrook is a locality in the Northern Rivers region of New South Wales, Australia. In , Blakebrook had a population of 132 people.

Notes

Towns in New South Wales
Northern Rivers
City of Lismore